Michael S. Montalbano  (28 April 1918 – 13 April 1989) was a computer scientist most noted for authoring "APL Blossom Time", a poem about the early days of the APL programming language,  performed to the tune of The Battle of New Orleans. He published this poem and a few other articles under the pseudonym "J. C. L. Guest".

In 1974, he wrote a book called Decision Tables published by Science Research Associates.

References

External links 
 A Personal History of APL, October 1982

1918 births
1989 deaths
Computer scientists